Nyundo may refer to:
Nyundo, Kenya, a settlement in Kenya's Coast Province
Nyundo, Rubavu, a mission in Rwanda on the Sebeya River to the east of Gisenyi
Roman Catholic Diocese of Nyundo, a diocese of the Roman Catholic Church in Rwanda with headquarters at Nyundo 
Mwabaya Nyundo, a settlement in Kenya's Coast Province